The 26th Iowa Infantry Regiment was an infantry regiment that served in the Union Army during the American Civil War.

Service
The 26th Iowa Infantry was organized at Clinton, Iowa and mustered in for three years of Federal service  on September 30, 1862.  The regiment was a part of the 3rd brigade, 1st division, XV Corps (Union Army).

The regiment was mustered out on June 6, 1865.

Total strength and casualties
A total of  965 men served in the 26th Iowa at one time or another during its existence.
It suffered 6 officers and 70 enlisted men who were killed in action or who died of their wounds and 4 officers and 213 enlisted men who died of disease, for a total of 293 fatalities.

Commanders
Colonel Milo Smith

See also
List of Iowa Civil War Units
Iowa in the American Civil War

Notes

References
The Civil War Archive

Units and formations of the Union Army from Iowa
Military units and formations established in 1862
1862 establishments in Iowa
Military units and formations disestablished in 1865